Most Rev Julius Babatunde Adelakun (born 1 November 1934) is the Emeritus Bishop of the Roman Catholic Diocese of Oyo. He  retired from active service in 2009 and was succeeded by Emmanuel Adetoyese Badejo the present Bishop of Oyo.

References

20th-century Roman Catholic bishops in Nigeria
1934 births
Living people
21st-century Roman Catholic bishops in Nigeria
Roman Catholic bishops of Oyo